Treimani is a village in Häädemeeste Parish, Pärnu County in southwestern Estonia.

Gallery

References

 

Villages in Pärnu County